Olympia is a 2011 Argentine indie film directed by Leo Damario and starring Mora Escola, Mercedes Morán, Edda Bustamante, María Nela Sinisterra and Victoria Bugallo.

The film narrates the story of an 18-year-old aspiring porn star and influencer, Olympia (Escola), who, after starring in a couple of amateur videos, enters the professional industry in her first major title, which involves a scene with 16 other men. Different personalities from the rock, fashion and porn universe are to accompany the 18 years to become a renowned pop culture star.

The film premiered in the 62nd Berlin International Film Festival in the European Film Market.

Cast  
 Mora Escola as Virginia/Olympia
 Victoria Bugallo as Micaela, Virginia's friend and first roommate
 Karina Noriega as Sol, Virginia's sister
 Mercedes Morán as the porn director
 Victoria Spinsanti as Perla, a fellow porn-star, Virginia's lover and second roommate
 Edda Bustamante as Lebon
 María Nela Sinisterra as Vernita, a professional porn star

References

External links
 

2011 films
Argentine drama films
2010s Spanish-language films
Argentine independent films
2011 LGBT-related films
LGBT-related drama films
Argentine LGBT-related films
2010s Argentine films